Bāba-aḫa-iddina, typically inscribed mdBA.Ú-PAB-AŠ "Bau has given me a brother,” ca. 812 BC, was the 9th king of the Dynasty of E, a mixed dynasty of kings of Babylon, but probably for less than a year. He briefly succeeded Marduk-balāssu-iqbi, who had been deposed by the Assyrians, a fate he was to share.

Biography 
His name was traditionally the name of a second son. He may have been a paqid mātāti official attested in the earlier reign, possibly from the Babylonian nobility who was the son of an otherwise unknown individual named Lidanu. This is a prebend grant from the second year of Marduk-balāssu-iqbi which records him as a witness: mdBA.Ú-ŠEŠ-SUM-na DUMU mli-da-nu LÚ.PA É.KUR.MEŠ.

His reign was brought to its end by the sixth campaign of the Assyrian king, Šamši-Adad V, as described in his Annals: “In Ni.. I besieged [him]. By means of boring and siege machines [I c]aptured that [city]. Bāba-aḫa-iddina together with the standard (durigallu)…I took away.” A more detailed account of the events following this victory is provided in the Synchronistic History:

Šamši-Adad made no attempt to annex Babylonia which remained independent, though kingless for a period, but returned to Assyria where he spent his last year, according to the eponym record, “in the land.” Finkel and Reade proposed a restoration of the final, broken part of the Synchronistic History to give: “Adad-nirari III king of Assyria and B[aba-aḫa-iddina king of Karduniaš towards each other], bowed and drank wine. The welf[are of their lands they established]…” They suggested that a pro-Babylonian Šammur-amat, while acting as Assyrian regent for the boy-king Adad-nirari, may have moved to have Bāba-aḫa-iddina reinstated to stabilize their southern neighbor.

Inscriptions

References 

9th-century BC Babylonian kings
9th-century BC rulers